Bence Daru (born 5 June 1994) is a Hungarian football player who plays for Szeged-Csanád.

Club statistics

Updated to games played as of 9 December 2017.

External links

1994 births
Footballers from Budapest
Living people
Hungarian footballers
Association football forwards
Budapest Honvéd FC II players
BFC Siófok players
Zalaegerszegi TE players
Paksi FC players
Győri ETO FC players
Nyíregyháza Spartacus FC players
Csákvári TK players
Szeged-Csanád Grosics Akadémia footballers
Nemzeti Bajnokság I players
Nemzeti Bajnokság II players